Edgar "Vovô" Pereira (born May 13, 1982), also known as "Edgar Vovô" is a Brazilian professional skateboarder.

Early life 
Pereira was introduced to skateboarding while working as a motorcycle courier in São Bernardo do Campo in 1998. Initially focused on street style riding, Edgard was introduced to mini-ramp skateboarding in 1999 by "the crowd", a group of skateboarders in the Jordanopolis neighborhood. Transition style skateboarding quickly became Pereira's passion, and he began competing in Vert skateboarding contests in Brazil.

Career 
Pereira is most known for his competition in Mega Ramp contests. In 2010, he was invited to his first X Games and finished 6th. In the following year, he finished in 3rd place at X Games Big Air, solidifying his place as a top rider. During the next years he was invited to participate at X Games around the world and was always a top finisher. In 2014, Vovo achieved 3rd place finishes in both the Brazilian Skate Circuit Vertical and X Games Austin Big Air where his run consisted of a backflip and a huge backside 540 heelflip flip, a never before seen trick.

Contest history 
 2002: 1st in Skate Vertical Amador
 2003: 1st in Skate Vertical Amador
 2005: 4th in X Games Brasil, Vertical
 2006: 5th in Rio Vert Jam, Vertical
 2007: 6th in Rio Vert Jam, Vertical
 2008: 8th in OI Vert Jam, Vertical
 2008: 9th in X Games, Big Air
 2009: 5th in X Games, Big Air
 2010: 2nd in Circuito Brasileio de Skate, Vertical
 2010: 6th in X Games, Big Air
 2011: 3rd in X Games, Big Air
 2012: 4th in Circuito Brasileio de Skate, Vertical
 2012: 8th in X Games Los Angeles, Big Air
 2013: 6th in Copa Brasil de Skate, Vertical
 2013: 5th in X Games Foz do Iguaçu, Big Air
 2013: 7th in X Games Barcelona, Big Air
 2013: 6th in X Games Munich, Big Air
 2013: 5th in X Games Los Angeles, Big Air
 2014: 3rd in Brazilian Skate Circuit, Vertical
 2014: 3rd in X Games Austin, Big Air
 2015: 7th in X Games Austin, Big Air

References 

Brazilian skateboarders
1982 births
Living people
X Games athletes